Chaulden is a residential district in Hemel Hempstead, Hertfordshire, England located west of the town centre and bordering on open countryside. It was  an early development in the construction of Hemel Hempstead new town, commenced in 1953 and has its own neighbourhood shopping centre.

The name Chaulden can be traced back to 1523 as a local field name and as meaning a chalky valley.

A country house and estate called Chaulden House occupied the area during the nineteenth century. Chaulden House stables and an octagonal tower dating from the mid-19th century are all that now remain of the house. The tower may have been a dovecote. It is currently used by the NHS.

The ancient Chaulden Lane is thought to preserve the route of Akeman Street, the Roman Road along the Bulbourne valley  

A large part of the site was previously occupied by Pixies Hill – a children's camp run by the National Camps Corporation. The old camp buildings were converted into the district's first school before permanent schools could be constructed.

Building work on the new town district commenced in 1953 with the first houses occupied in December of that year.

The Chaulden Neighbourhood centre – a parade of shops set in a crescent around a car park – was completed in 1958. A nearby pub, the Tudor Rose, also built by the New Town corporation, celebrates Hemel Hempstead's link to the Tudor King Henry VIII, who gave the town its charter.

The population of the appropriate Dacorum Ward (Chaulden and Warner's End) at the 2011 Censuswas 9,146.

Sport
Hemel Hempstead (Camelot) Rugby Club play on Chaulden Meadow off Chaulden Lane.

References

Villages in Hertfordshire
Areas of Hemel Hempstead